Agrokipia is a village in the Nicosia District of Cyprus, located 3 km west of Klirou.

References

Communities in Nicosia District